KVLE (610 AM) was a radio station licensed to Vail, Colorado, United States. The station was owned by Pilgrim Communications, Inc.

History
The station was assigned the call letters KRVV on October 25, 1982. On February 6, 1988, the station changed its call sign to KSPN, on January 29, 1990, to KSKE, and on September 9, 2004, to KVLE.

On November 21, 2014, the FCC dismissed the station's renewal of license application and cancelled the license, deleting it from their records, after the station failed to respond to a silent request.

References

External links

VLE (AM)
Defunct radio stations in the United States
Radio stations disestablished in 2014
2014 disestablishments in Colorado
VLE (AM)